A constitutional referendum was held in South Korea on 21 November 1972. President Park Chung-hee had suspended the constitution and dissolved the National Assembly in October.  Work began almost immediately on a new constitution.  The finished product, the Yushin Constitution, was a severely authoritarian document that dramatically expanded the president's powers and allowed him to run for an unlimited number of six-year terms. For all intents and purposes, the document concentrated all governing power in Park's hands.

According to official figures, the new document was approved by 92.3% of voters, with a turnout of 91.9%. The adoption of the constitution upon the announcement of the official referendum results ushered in the Fourth Republic of South Korea.

Results

By province

References

1972 referendums
1972 elections in South Korea
Constitutional referendums in South Korea